The Constitution Alteration (Fair Elections) Bill 1988, was an unsuccessful proposal to alter the Australian Constitution to enshrine the principle that each elector's vote should have equal value in Australia, also referred to as one vote, one value, including in states and territories. It was put to voters for approval in a referendum held on 3 September 1988.

Question
A Proposed Law: To alter the Constitution to provide for 4 year maximum terms for members of both Houses of the Commonwealth Parliament.

Do you approve this proposed alteration?

The proposal was to vary existing provisions of the Constitution as follows (removed text stricken through; substituted text in bold):
Section 8 Qualification of electors
Subject to this Constitution,the qualification of electors of senators shall be in each State or Territory that which is prescribed by this Constitution, or by the Parliament as the qualification for electors of members of the House of Representatives; but in the choosing of senators each elector shall vote only once.

Section 25 Provision as to races disqualified from voting
For the purposes of the last section, if by the law of any State all persons of any race are disqualified from voting at elections for the more numerous House of the Parliament of the State, then, in reckoning the number of the people of the State or of the Commonwealth, persons of that race resident in that State shall not be counted.

Section 29 Electoral divisions
Until the Parliament of the Commonwealth otherwise provides, the Parliament of any State may make laws for determining the divisions in each State for which members of the House of Representatives may be chosen, and the number of members to be chosen for each division. A division shall not be formed out of parts of different States.
In the absence of other provision, each State shall be one electorate.

Section 30 Qualification of electors
Until the Parliament otherwise provides, the qualification of electors of members of the House of Representatives shall be in each State that which is prescribed by the law of the State as the qualification of electors of the more numerous House of Parliament of the State; but in the choosing of members each elector shall vote only once.
Subject to this Constitution, the qualification of electors of members of the House of Representatives shall be, in each State or Territory, that which is prescribed by the Parliament.

Section 41 Right of electors of States
No adult person who has or acquires a right to vote at elections for the more numerous House of the Parliament of a State shall, while the right continues, be prevented by any law of the Commonwealth from voting at elections for either House of the Parliament of the Commonwealth.

The proposal was to add the following new provisions to the Constitution:Section 107A Election of State Parliaments

Section 122A Election of certain Territory legislatures

CHAPTER VIA FAIR ELECTIONS
Interpretation.
124A In this Chapter
'election', means an election for choosing

'electoral region' means

'fair distribution' means a determination of electoral divisions in accordance with section one hundred and twenty-four C
Votes to have equal value.
124B (1) In

the method of voting shall be such that, with respect to the votes of all electors in the division, or in the electorate, as the case may be, votes shall not be weighted according to different classes of electors

Fair distributions of electoral divisions.

Elections in divisions.

'House' means

'month' means one of the twelve months of the year;

Elections where electoral region to be one electorate.

but so that the method of choosing those members shall be a system of proportional representation

Casual vacancies.
124F Nothing in this Constitution prevents the filling of a casual vacancy in the membership of

Right to challenge determinations of electoral divisions.

Right to vote.

Electors to have only one vote.

each elector shall vote only once.

Results

Discussion
This was the second unsuccessful referendum that sought to enshrine proportional representation in Australia, also referred to as one vote, one value and prevent gerrymandering by the use of electoral malapportionment.

See also
Politics of Australia
History of Australia

References

Further reading
  
 
 Australian Electoral Commission (2007) Referendum Dates and Results 1906 – Present AEC, Canberra.

1988 referendums
Referendum (Fair Elections)
1988 (Fair Elections)
Proposed laws of Australia